The 2024 United States Senate election in West Virginia will be held on November 5, 2024, to elect a member of the United States Senate to represent the state of West Virginia. Incumbent Democratic Senator Joe Manchin was first elected in a 2010 special election to replace Robert Byrd, who died in office. He won his first full term in a landslide in 2012 and was narrowly re-elected to a second full term in 2018. He has indicated that he is running for reelection to a third full term in office, but has not made a definitive statement.

West Virginia was a Democratic stronghold from the New Deal through the 1990s, but like much of rural Appalachia, the state has rapidly swung towards the Republican Party in the years since. It is now staunchly Republican, giving Donald Trump a 39 percentage point margin of victory in the 2020 presidential election, his second-strongest performance in the nation. However, Manchin has continued to see electoral success, positioning himself as a centrist to conservative Democrat with strong ties to the state.

The Republican Party has identified the contest as a top priority in the 2024 election cycle. Due to the state's heavy partisan lean, the narrow margin by which Manchin was reelected in 2018 (even amid a national Democratic wave), and a likely strong Republican presidential performance on the same ballot, analysts currently consider the race to either be a tossup or leaning towards the Republican Party. Should Manchin not run, analysts believe the seat will be an easy Republican pickup.

Democratic primary

Candidates

Publicly expressed interest
Joe Manchin, incumbent U.S. Senator (2010–present) (decision expected in December 2023)

Endorsements

Republican primary

Candidates

Declared 
 Chris Rose, coal miner

Publicly expressed interest
 Jim Justice, 36th Governor of West Virginia (2017–present) (decision expected in March 2023)
 Patrick Morrisey, West Virginia Attorney General (2013–present) and nominee for this seat in 2018 (decision expected by April 2023)

Potential
Evan Jenkins, former Chief Justice of the West Virginia Supreme Court of Appeals (2021–2022) from position 5 (2018–2022), former U.S. Representative from West Virginia's 3rd congressional district (2015–2018), and candidate for U.S. Senate in 2018

 Don Blankenship, former chairman and CEO of Massey Energy, candidate for the U.S. Senate in 2018, and Constitution Party nominee for president in 2020

Declined

Endorsements

Polling

General election

Predictions

Polling

Joe Manchin vs. Jim Justice

Joe Manchin vs. Alex Mooney

Joe Manchin vs. Patrick Morrisey

Notes

References

External links
Official campaign websites 
Alex Mooney (R) for Senate 
Chris Rose (R) for Senate

2024
West Virginia
United States Senate